Archibald Montgomerie, 11th Earl of Eglinton (18 May 172630 October 1796) was a Scottish General and Member of Parliament (MP) in the British Parliament. He was also the Clan Chief of the Clan Montgomery. Montgomerie fought in the Seven Years' War, where he served with George Washington. He also was the patron of the poet Robert Burns.

Early life
Archibald Montgomerie was born on 18 May 1726 to Alexander Montgomerie, 9th Earl of Eglinton, and the 9th Earl's third wife, Susanna Kennedy. Montgomerie was one of the 9th Earl's twenty children. Montgomerie was educated at Eton during his teenage years and then went to Winchester College. At age 13, Montgomerie joined the army.

Military career
After joining the army, Montgomerie received a commission as a Cornet in the Scots Greys. He served in this rank from 1739 to 1740. He became Major of the 36th Regiment in 1751, and was elected Lieutenant-Colonel of the regiment on 4 January 1757. At the outbreak of the Seven Years' War, Montgomerie raised the Montgomerie's Highlanders. The regiment traveled to the American Colonies in 1757, and Montgomerie was put under the command of General Amherst. Montgomerie and his regiment, along with George Washington and Henry Bouquet, joined the expedition against Fort Duquesne in 1758. In 1760, he commanded an expedition against the Cherokee during the Anglo-Cherokee War. Montgomerie's expedition, which included 1,200 men, was ultimately unsuccessful in its mission but succeeded in reaping mass devastation on lower Cherokee country. Montgomerie led an assault on the Cherokee Lower Towns and had several Cherokee villages destroyed, including the major town of Keowee. He was defeated by the Cherokees, in 1760, at the Battle of Echoee and was forced to retreat back to Fort Prince George, failing in his mission to relieve the siege at Fort Loudoun.  

Between 1767 and 1795, Montgomerie was the Colonel of the 51st Regiment of Foot. During his service with the 51st, Montgomerie fought in the French Revolutionary Wars. He rose through the ranks of the British Military and became a Major General in 1772. He was Deputy Vice-Admiral of Irvine in 1777, within the Port of Irvine from Kelly Bridge to the Troon Point. He subsequently became a Lieutenant General, in 1777, and in 1793 was commissioned a Full General. From 1795 until 1796, Montgomerie was the Colonel of the Royal Scots Greys (2nd Dragoons).

Political career and Earldom
Montgomerie stood as a Whig in 1761 and was elected to two seats. He chose to give up Wigtown Burghs to sit in the seat for Ayrshire, and served in the House of Commons from 1761 to 1768. In 1761, Montgomerie became an Equerry for Queen Charlotte. He was appointed Governor of Dumbarton Castle in 1764 and Deputy Ranger of St. James's Park and Deputy Ranger of Hyde Park in 1766.

On 24 October 1769, Montgomerie's brother, Alexander Montgomerie, 10th Earl of Eglinton, was murdered by Mungo Campbell, after a dispute on whether or not Campbell could bear arms on the 10th Earl's property. The 10th Earl died in the early morning hours of 25 October 1769, and Montgomerie inherited the Earldom.

He was Grand Master of the Masonic Lodge of Mother Kilwinning, from 1771 until 1796. Montgomerie was elected as one of sixteen Scottish representative peers in 1776 and was re-elected in 1780, 1784, and 1790. Montgomerie was appointed Governor of Edinburgh Castle, in 1782, and served as Lord Lieutenant of Ayrshire between 1794 and 1796. Montgomerie was also the patron to the poet Robert Burns; Burns and Montgomerie kept in contact until the latter's death.

Montgomerie died on 30 October 1796 at Eglinton Castle. The Earldom passed to a third cousin, Hugh Montgomerie, 12th Earl of Eglinton. However, the majority of Archibald Montgomerie's wealth went to his daughter Mary, whose son eventually became the 13th Earl of Eglinton.

There is a portrait of Montgomerie in Windsor Castle. It was offered back to the family by King William IV, but the 13th Earl declined. He felt that it was an honour to have a portrait of his grandfather at Windsor Castle.

Personal life

Montgomerie was married twice. He was first married, to Lady Jean (Jane) Lindsay, who was the daughter of George Lindsay-Crawford, 21st Earl of Crawford and Lady Jean Hamilton, on 30 March 1772. Jean died in 1778 without issue. 

On 9 August, 1783, Montgomerie married Frances Twysden, the daughter of Sir William Twysden, 6th Baronet and Mary Jervis, has his second wife.  They divorced on 6 February 1788 on account on her affair with Douglas Hamilton, 8th Duke of Hamilton with whom she allegedly had a daughter.

He and Frances had two children:

Lady Mary Montgomerie (5 March 178712 Jun 1848). Mary was married to Lord Hugh Montgomerie. Their son, Archibald Montgomerie, 13th Earl of Eglinton, would eventually succeed to the Earldom. It is through Mary that the lineal and male lines of the Montgomerie family would unite, which would return the Earldom of Eglinton to her descendants.
Lady Susanna Montgomerie (26 May 178816 Nov 1805). Susanna died unmarried. Her real father may have been Douglas Hamilton.

See also
Clan Montgomery
Barony and Castle of Giffen
Eglinton Castle

Notes

References
 A dialogue of the dead: betwixt Lord Eglinton and Mungo Campbell. To which is added a genuine abstract of the trial of Mungo Campbell. ECCO Print Edition. 
 Anderson, William, The Scottish nation: or, The surnames, families, literature, honours, and biographical history of the people of Scotland, Volume 2, A. Fullarton & co., 1877
 Beatson, Robert, A political index to the histories of Great Britain & Ireland, or, a complete register of the hereditary honours, public offices, and persons in office: from the earliest periods to the present time, Longman, Hurst, Rees, and Orme, 1806
 Boswell, James, Cole, Richard Cargill, Baker, Peter Stuart, McClellan, Rachel, The General Correspondence of James Boswell, 1766-1769: 1768-1769, Edinburgh University Press, 1997, 
 Burke, John, Burke's genealogical and heraldic history of the peerage, baronetage and knightage ..., Burke's Peerage Limited, 1914
 Burns, Robert, The complete works of Robert Burns (self-interpreting) Illustrated with sixty etchings and wood cuts, maps and facsimiles, Gebbie & co., 1886
 
 Chisholm, Hugh, Encyclopaedia britannica: a dictionary of arts, sciences, literature and general information, The Encyclopædia Britannica Co., 1910
 Colburn, Henry, A genealogical and heraldic dictionary of the peerage and baronetage of the British Empire, Volume 42, Part 1, Henry Colburn, 1880
 Courthope, William, The Baronetage of England, J. G. & F. Rivington, 1839
 Crawfurd, George, A general description of the shire of Renfrew: including an account of the noble and ancient families ... To which is added, a genealogical history of the royal house of Stewart, and of the several noble and illustrious families of that name, from the year 1034 to the year 1710, J. Neilson, 1818
 Debrett, John, Debrett's Peerage of England, Scotland, and Ireland. [Another], 1839
 Debrett, John, Debrett's peerage of the United Kingdom of Great Britain and Ireland, Volume 2, 1825
 Freeman, Douglas Southall, Washington, Simon and Schuster, 1995 
 Freemason's Magazine, The Freemasons' quarterly (magazine and) review afterw. The Freemasons' monthly magazine. Continued as The Freemasons' magazine and masonic mirror, 1868
 Guthrie, Arthur, Historical memoir of the family of Eglinton and Winton, together with relative notes and illustrations, Arthur Guthrie, 1864
 Holman, Louis Arthur, Mills, Charles B., Scenes from the life of Benjamin Franklin, Small, Maynard & company, 1916
 Irvine, Scotland, Muniments of the Royal Burgh of Irvine: Miscellaneous muniments. Council book of Irvine. Excerpts from burgh accounts, Ayrshire & Galloway Archaeological Association, 1891.
 Lenman, Bruce, Integration and enlightenment: Scotland 1746-1832, Edinburgh University Press, 1992, 
 Martin, George M., British Masonic Miscellany, Part 4, Kessinger Publishing, 2003,

External links
 History of Parliament: House of Commons 1754-1790, by Sir Lewis Namier and James Brooke, Sidgwick & Jackson, 1964

1726 births
1796 deaths
People educated at Eton College
People educated at Winchester College
Anglo-Scots
British Army generals
Clan Montgomery
British Army personnel of the French and Indian War
11
Lord-Lieutenants of Ayrshire
Members of the Parliament of Great Britain for Scottish constituencies
Royal Scots Greys officers
Scottish representative peers
British MPs 1761–1768